Pablo Villanueva Branda (born 17 September 1935), known as Melcochita, is a Peruvian comedian and Sonero singer, born in barrio La Victoria, in Lima, Perú. Known in the 1950s as Pacocha, he and his brothers created the band "Son Cubillas". 
He made various Latin music albums produced in Peru and New York, achieving some hits in the salsa market. Melcochita has acted as comedian on Peruvian TV in the shows A Reír, Risas y Salsa and Recargados de Risa. He was nominated for the Latin Grammys in 2019 for his new Song "La Momia".

Discography 

 Karamanduka y Melcochita with Mag Peruvian All Stars
 Picardías de Melcochita'''
 A comer lechón La estrella del son (with Johnny Pacheco)
 Con sabor a pueblo 
 Los hermanos de la salsa (with Lita Branda)
 Mis Mejores Éxitos''

References 

 http://trome.pe/tag/41079/melcochita

Salsa musicians
Peruvian comedians
People from Lima
Peruvian musicians
1936 births
Living people